City of Ghosts is a 2002 American crime thriller film co-written, directed by and starring Matt Dillon, about a con artist who must go to Cambodia to collect his share of money from an insurance scam. The film was made in Cambodia, in locations that include Phnom Penh and the Bokor Hill Station.

It premiered at the Toronto International Film Festival in 2002, and was released in the United States on April 25, 2003.

Premise
Jimmy is a conman who has been working for an insurance company in New York City that the FBI is investigating since it cannot pay policyholder claims following a hurricane. The mastermind of the scheme and his mentor, Marvin, is in Thailand.

In Bangkok, Jimmy learns from Joseph Kaspar, a partner in the scheme, that Marvin is in Cambodia, where he is involved in a casino scheme. The roads are not safe so a guide takes Jimmy by back trail to Phnom Penh. There, he hires a cyclo driver named Sok, to take him to his destination, a run-down bar and hotel owned by a Frenchman named Emile.

He learns to trust the word of Sok when attempting to make contact as there are unsafe places and people. He meets an NGO worker named Sophie and dabbles in romance with her while attending a rave party at an ancient temple.

Marvin turns up, but the scam he is trying to put together – involving corrupt Cambodian government officials, high-ranking military and the Russian mafia – turns out to be more risky and dangerous than was anticipated.

Cast
 Matt Dillon as Jimmy
 James Caan as Marvin
 Stellan Skarsgård as Joseph Kaspar
 Natascha McElhone as Sophie
 Gérard Depardieu as Emile
 Kem Sereyvuth as Sok
 Rose Byrne as Sabrina
 Kyoza as Rocky
 Loto as The Red Tuxedo Man
 Robert Campbell as Simon
 Bo Hopkins as Teddy (uncredited)

Release

Box office
Made on a budget of $17.5 million, the film only gained a limited release, and made $357,197 at the domestic box office, and a total of $1.3 million worldwide.

Critical reception
On review aggregator Rotten Tomatoes, the film holds an approval rating of 47% based on 66 reviews, with an average rating of 5.53/10. The website's critics consensus called the film "Atmospheric, but that's about it." On Metacritic, the film has a weighted average score of 57 out of 100, based on 26 critics, indicating "mixed or average reviews".

Soundtrack

The soundtrack for City of Ghosts features an eclectic mix of music that includes 1960s-70s Cambodian rock and roll, French pop and American pre-World War II blues and jazz.

References

External links
 
 
 

2002 films
2002 crime thriller films
2002 directorial debut films
French-language American films
Khmer-language films
2000s Russian-language films
American neo-noir films
Films set in Cambodia
Films set in New York City
Films set in Thailand
Films shot in Cambodia
United Artists films
Films scored by Tyler Bates
American crime thriller films
2000s English-language films
2000s American films